The PGM Sime Darby Harvard Championship is a men's professional golf tournament held in Malaysia co-sanctioned by the Asian Development Tour and the PGM Tour (Professional Golf of Malaysia). The tournament was first played in 2013 as the PGM Sime Darby Harvard Masters and the inaugural winner was James Bowen.

Winners

Notes

References

External links
Coverage on the Asian Development Tour's official site

Golf tournaments in Malaysia
2013 establishments in Malaysia